No. 540 Squadron RAF was a photoreconnaissance squadron of the Royal Air Force from 1942 to 1956.

History

Formation and World War II
The squadron was formed on 19 October 1942 from 'H' and 'L' flights of No. 1 PRU at RAF Leuchars as a photoreconnaissance unit with the de Havilland Mosquito.
It operated from Leuchars to carry out missions over Norway and Germany, while a detachment based at RAF Benson carried out similar missions over France and Italy. Another detachment, based at RAF Gibraltar covered the south of France and Algeria, but from 1944 on the unit was wholly based at RAF Benson, the range of the later Mosquito permitting missions deep in Austria or to the Canary Islands. In March 1945 the squadron went overseas, to Coulommiers in France, coming back to the UK in November, again at RAF Benson where the unit was disbanded on 30 September 1946, when it was renumbered to 58 Squadron.

Post-war

On 1 December 1947 No. 540 squadron was reformed at Benson, from the Mosquito element of 58 Squadron, taking up its old role and still flying Mosquitoes again as well. In December 1952 these gave way to English Electric Canberras, the last Mosquito leaving in September 1953. By that time the squadron had moved to RAF Wyton, where the unit disbanded on 31 March 1956.

1953 London to Christchurch air race
In 1953 the squadron formed a "NZ Air Race Flight" to train and carry out the RAF participation in the 1953 London to Christchurch air race, Flight Lieutenant Monty Burton won the race in Canberra PR3 WE139 now on public display at the Royal Air Force Museum.

Aircraft operated

Squadron bases

Commanding officers

See also
 List of Royal Air Force aircraft squadrons

References

Notes

Bibliography

External links

 Squadron history on MOD site
 Bases and airfields used on www.rafcommands.com
 No 521 – 540 Squadron Histories
 Secret operations of 540 squadron using Canberras

Military units and formations established in 1942
Aircraft squadrons of the Royal Air Force in World War II
540 Squadron
Reconnaissance units and formations of the Royal Air Force
Military units and formations disestablished in 1956
1942 establishments in the United Kingdom
1956 disestablishments in the United Kingdom